20th Century Masters – The Millennium Collection: The Best of Steve Earle is a compilation album by Steve Earle. The album was released on August 19, 2003.

Critical reception

The release of this album met with mixed reviews. Chip O'Brien of PopMatters, in a review that also examined the driving force behind Best Of compilations, considered this album to be an attempt by MCA to "make a couple of bucks off the portion of his catalog they still had legal access to."
Similarly William Ruhlmann of AllMusic said that this album "predictably treats Earle's career as if it lasted only from 1985-1988 and consisted only of his earlier MCA Records recordings."

Track listing

References

2003 greatest hits albums
Steve Earle compilation albums
Earle, Steve
MCA Records compilation albums